"Under Control" is a song recorded by Scottish DJ Calvin Harris and Swedish DJ Alesso, featuring vocals from Theo Hutchcraft, credited to his duo Hurts. The song was released on 7 October 2013 as the first single from Harris's fourth studio album, Motion (2014), and the second single from Alesso's debut studio album, Forever (2015).

"Under Control" debuted at number one on the UK Singles Chart with first-week sales of 74,704 copies, becoming Harris's fifth number-one single, and the first for Alesso and Hurts.

Background
"Under Control" was premiered on 2 August 2013 during a DJ set by Alesso at Ushuaia, Ibiza, which was broadcast by BBC Radio 1. Harris performed the song at the end of his set at the V Festival on 20 August. On 18 September, Harris posted a preview of the song on SoundCloud. The cover was unveiled on Alesso's Twitter page on 4 October.

Music video
On 9 September 2013, Harris stated on Facebook that 1,000 fans would take a part in the music video shoot. Later a message was reposted by Alesso and Theo Hutchcraft from Hurts in a blog on Twitter. The video was shot in Los Angeles on 10 and 11 September. On the second day of the shoot, already with the fans, filming was held at the 6th Street Bridge, for an EDM concert held by the song's artists celebrating the end of the world. The world didn't actually end in the video because the meteor failed to hit the Earth. The video was uploaded to Harris's Vevo account on 21 October 2013 and has over 190 million views.

Track listings

Personnel
Credits adapted from CD single liner notes.

 Alesso – all instruments, engineering, mixing, production, songwriting
 Calvin Harris – all instruments, engineering, mixing, production, songwriting
 Theo Hutchcraft – vocals, songwriting
 Mike Marsh – mastering

Charts

Weekly charts

Year-end charts

Certifications

Release history

References

2013 singles
2013 songs
Alesso songs
Calvin Harris songs
Columbia Records singles
Hurts songs
Songs written by Calvin Harris
Number-one singles in Scotland
UK Singles Chart number-one singles
Songs written by Alesso
Songs written by Theo Hutchcraft
Song recordings produced by Alesso